Ricardo Mollo (born August 17, 1957) is an Argentine musician, producer, singer and composer of Argentinian rock.

Career
Mollo became known in the 1980s as the guitarist of Sumo, with whom he released four studio albums until 1987, when the vocalist of the group, Luca Prodan, died of liver cirrhosis. After Sumo, with the bassist Diego Arnedo, he formed the band Divididos.

He is considered one of the best musicians and guitarists of Argentine rock. He is also known for his virtuosity on the guitar, and particularly for his version of "Voodoo Child" by Jimi Hendrix, which he has played on his guitar using his teeth or objects thrown by the public including carrots, slippers, sandals, tennis balls, or canes for the blind.

Besides his work as a bandleader, he is a producer and has produced Latin American artists including Cuca, León Gieco, Charly García, Gustavo Cerati, Los Piojos, Las Pelotas, La Renga, and Luis Alberto Spinetta.

Personal life
He was in a relationship with the singer Érica García between 1989 and 1999. In 2002, he married Uruguayan actress Natalia Oreiro, with whom he had a son in 2012.

Discography

Sumo 
 Divididos por la Felicidad (1985)
 Llegando los Monos (1986)
 After Chabón (1987)

Divididos 
 40 dibujos ahí en el piso (1989)
 Acariciando lo áspero (1991)
 La era de la boludez (1993)
 Otro le travaladna (1995)
 Divididos (1996)
 Gol de mujer (1998)
 10 (1999)
 Narigón del siglo (2000)
 Viveza criolla (2000)
 Vengo del placard de otro (2002)
 Vivo Acá (2003)
 Amapola del 66 (2010)
 Audio y agua (2011)

References

External links 
Interview with Ricardo Mollo (in Spanish)

1957 births
20th-century Argentine male singers
Argentine rock singers
Living people
Musicians from Buenos Aires
Rock en Español musicians
Singers from Buenos Aires
21st-century Argentine male singers
Argentine male guitarists
Argentine male singer-songwriters